The 37th Infantry Division (37-ya Pekhotnaya Diviziya) was an infantry formation of the Russian Imperial Army. It headquarters was located at Saint Petersburg.

Organization
It was part of the 18th Army Corps.
1st Brigade
145th Infantry Regiment
146th Infantry Regiment
2nd Brigade
147th Infantry Regiment
148th Infantry Regiment
37th Artillery Brigade

Commanders
10.13.1863 - xx.xx.xxxx - Lieutenant General Teterevnikov, Nikolai Kuzmich
07.24.1866 - 03.21.1879 - major general (from 28.03.1871 - lieutenant general) Chenger, Xavier (Onufry) Osipovich
хх.хх.1879 - хх.хх.1888 - Lieutenant General Gelfreich, Alexander Bogdanovich
01/20/1888 - 12/21/1893 - Lieutenant-General Prince Romanovsky Eugen Maximilianovich, 5th Duke of Leuchtenberg
01/05/1900 - 11/15/1901 - Lieutenant General Skaryatin, Nikolai Dmitrievich
11/15/1901 - 03/16/1903 - Lieutenant General Maltzov, Ivan Sergeevich
04/18/1903 - 10/23/1904 - Lieutenant General Chekmarev, Andrey Ivanovich
10.23.1904 - 08.18.1905 - Lieutenant General Andrey Selivanov
04/30/1907 - 11/19/1909 - Lieutenant General Kurganovich, Konstantin Osipovich
11/19/1909 - 07/30/1912 - major general (from 06/06/1909 - lieutenant general) Vasily Flug
07/30/1912 - 03/27/1915 - Lieutenant General Andrei Zayonchkovski
07/17/1915 - 10/17/1917 - Lieutenant General of Wadenschern, Torsten Karlovich
10.17.1917 - xx.xx.xxxx - Major General Pavel Sytin

References

Infantry divisions of the Russian Empire
Military units and formations disestablished in 1918
Saint Petersburg Governorate